Lucas Rojo  (born April 5, 1994) is a Brazilian baseball player.

Philadelphia Phillies 
He spent three seasons in the Venezuelan Summer League playing for the Phillies. He batted .275 in 128 games.

International career
He was selected for Brazil national baseball team at the 2013 World Baseball Classic Qualification, 2013 World Baseball Classic, 2017 World Baseball Classic Qualification, 2019 Pan American Games Qualifier, and 2021 World Baseball Classic Qualifier.

References

External links

1951 births
Living people
Brazilian expatriate baseball players in Japan
Brazilian expatriate sportspeople in Venezuela
Baseball second basemen
Baseball third basemen
Sportspeople from São Paulo (state)
Venezuelan Summer League Phillies players
2013 World Baseball Classic players
Brazilian expatriate baseball players in Venezuela